SoundStorm is a brand by Nvidia regarding to a SIP block integrating 5.1 surround sound technology found on the die of their nForce and nForce2 chipsets for x86 CPUs. It is also the name of a certification to be obtained by Nvidia when complying with their specifications.

Certification
The SoundStorm certification ensured that many manufacturers produced solutions with high quality sound output. To achieve SoundStorm certification, a motherboard had to use the nForce or nForce2 chipsets and also include the specified discrete outputs. It was also necessary to meet certain sound quality levels as tested by Dolby Digital sound labs.

At the time SoundStorm was the only available solution capable of outputting Dolby Digital Live, coveted in home theater PCs.

Hardware
The SoundStorm SIP block is said to consist of a series of fixed-function and general-purpose processing units providing a combined total of reportedly 4 billion operations per second. A fully programmable, Motorola 56300-based digital signal processor (DSP) is provided for effects processing but with very limited support under DirectX on the PC.

The DSP on the APU was normally driven by code largely derived from the 3D audio middleware company Sensaura. The Sensaura middleware was also used by the Windows drivers of nearly every sound card and audio codec other than those by Creative. Unlike the usual software implementations of the Sensaura code, the SoundStorm solution ran the same code on a hardware DSP, which resulted in extremely low CPU usage. It was also capable of realtime Dolby Digital 5.1 encoding. Compared to other audio solutions of the day, the difference in CPU usage when running popular multimedia applications was as much as 10-20%. While the Audigy offers similar performance, it does so at a much higher price point, and only as a discrete add-in solution.

The nForce2 APU was a purely digital component, and that motherboard manufacturers still had to use codec chips such as the 650 from Realtek for the audio output functions, including the necessary digital to analog conversion (DAC). After the demise of SoundStorm, codec chips such as the Realtek 850 have become standard integrated audio solutions, with audio processing functions offloaded on the host processor. As such, the quality of the device drivers is very important to ensure reasonably low host processor usage, without audio quality issues.

Drivers
Since the SoundStorm solution was a general-purpose DSP where code was uploaded to the card by the device drivers at boot time, this made it easy to add new functionality to SoundStorm. However, it also meant that it was not possible to create third-party device drivers for the SoundStorm, since they did not have access to the DSP code. Linux drivers for the SoundStorm actually talk directly to the audio codec (like a RealTek ALC650), bypassing the APU completely and doing all audio calculations on the CPU and leaving the SoundStorm DSP idle.

History

Video game consoles 
Reportedly SoundStorm development was originally funded by Microsoft for use in the Xbox gaming console. At time of writing reportedly a second generation chip has been developed, this time with funding from Sony, as part of the PlayStation 3 project. It was hinted that SoundStorm may make return to the PC scene, possibly as part of a multimedia graphics card, along the lines of the original NV1 card, rather than as a discrete or onboard solution. While there did appear to be plans for a discrete product at one point, this never materialised.

Discontinuation 
Nvidia decided the cost of including the SoundStorm SIP block on the dies of their chipsets was too high and was not included in nForce3 and beyond.

Alternatives 
Other manufacturers have since produced standalone sound cards based on C-Media chips such as the CMI8788 which also provide Dolby Digital and DTS encoding features.  These manufacturers include Turtle Beach and Auzentech. A software alternative is redocneXk, which provides real-time AC3 encoding comparable to SoundStorm or Creative's Audigy2 and later sound cards. However, early versions of these alternatives may still be lagging behind the SoundStorm in terms of reliability, ease of use, and CPU usage.

In October 2013 AMD presented products with AMD TrueAudio. A block of DSPs to be used to offload calculations for 3D sound.

See also
 Comparison of Nvidia chipsets
 AMD TrueAudio

References

External links
 Nvidia: SoundStorm
 3DsoundSurge Review: NVIDIA nForce APU
 Sensaura (now owned by Creative)

Audio acceleration
Sound cards
Nvidia IP cores